Charles Pugsley Fincher (born December 30, 1945, in San Benito, Texas) is an American cartoonist and lawyer. His cartoons and comics focus on the law.

Education
Fincher received his bachelor's degree from the University of Texas at Austin in 1968, and he was a Distinguished Military Graduate of St. Mary's University School of Law, where he received his juris doctor in 1971.

Career
He was admitted to the State Bar of Texas in 1971 and admitted to practice before the Fifth Circuit and the U.S. District Court, Southern District of Texas. He has practiced law ever since.

In the 1970s, Fincher began publishing his law-related comics and strips. During 1987 he began his long-running Texas-themed political newspaper comic strip, Thadeus & Weez, which ran in 19 Texas newspapers before being retired in 2005. Also in 2005, he won the “Best Web Cartoons” in the "People's Pick" category from About.com for The Illustrated Daily Scribble. Besides Texas newspapers, his editorial cartoons have appeared in the Arizona Daily Star and the Boston Herald, and his work has been reprinted in textbooks and legal journals.

For five years, Fincher's monthly lawyer strip "Fenwilder & Jones" ran in the ABA Journal.

Fincher ended his long-running political comic strip, "The Illustrated Daily Scribble," in 2006, because, he was quoted as saying, "The Bush administration is hard to satirize." Then, a year later, he resumed "Scribble" and launched two new strips, "Scribble-in-Law" and "Scribble Beach". His most recent cartoon characters include Bitcher & Prickman, comic law partners. He is also the founder of LawComix, a cartoon site for lawyers. And he is the creator of "Legal Isms," 10  comic strips about lawyers, contracted by LexisNexis.

In 2008, Fincher was commissioned by the ABA's Council of Appellate Staff Attorneys (CASA) to paint a fantasy illustration of Constitutional law professor Erwin Chemerinsky as a shortstop with the Chicago Cubs, the scholar's favorite team. The painting was presented to Chemerinsky at a conference.

Fincher practices at The Allison Law Firm, a private firm that specializes in serious injury and wrongful death lawsuits, in South Padre Island, Texas.

References

External links

"The Daily Scribble" archives
LawComix by Charles Fincher
Off The Law blog by Charles Fincher
Lawyer-Slash-Artist blog, original artwork by Charles Fincher
Membership listing, The Association of American Editorial Cartoonists
Flak Magazine, Sunday Comics, Aug. 3, 2008
Law.com, The Legal Intelligencer: "A Sampling From the Varied Legal Blogosphere" (scroll down), Sept. 2, 2008

American comics artists
American comics writers
American editorial cartoonists
Artists from Texas
American comic strip cartoonists
Living people
American webcomic creators
1945 births
University of Texas at Austin alumni
St. Mary's University School of Law alumni
Texas lawyers
People from San Benito, Texas